James Cluskey and Maximilian Neuchrist won the title, defeating Roberto Ortega-Olmedo and Ricardo Villacorta-Alonso 6–7(5–7), 6–2, [10–8] in the final.

Seeds

Draw

Draw

References
 Main Draw

Guimaraes Open - Doubles
2013 Doubles
2013 in Portuguese tennis